Mount Hebron Cemetery may refer to:
 Mount Hebron Cemetery (Montclair, New Jersey), United States
 Mount Hebron Cemetery (New York City), New York, United States
 Mount Hebron Cemetery and Gatehouse, Winchester, Virginia, United States